The 1954 All-Big Seven Conference football team consists of American football players chosen by various organizations for All-Big Seven Conference teams for the 1954 college football season.  The selectors for the 1954 season included the Associated Press (AP) and the United Press (UP).  Players selected as first-team honorees by both the AP and UP are displayed in bold.

All-Big Seven selections

Backs
 Carroll Hardy, Colorado (AP-1; UP-1)
 Frank Bernardi, Colorado (AP-1; UP-1)
 Buddy Leake, Oklahoma (AP-1)
 Robert Smith, Nebraska (AP-1)
 Gene Calame, Oklahoma (UP-1)
 Corky Taylor, Kansas State (UP-1)

Ends
 Max Boydston, Oklahoma (AP-1; UP-1)
 Carl Allison, Oklahoma (AP-1; UP-1)

Tackles
 Al Portney, Missouri (AP-1; UP-1)
 Ron Nery, Kansas State (AP-1)
 Ray Marciniak, Kansas State (UP-1)

Guards
 Bo Bolinger, Oklahoma (AP-1; UP-1)
 Charles Bryant, Nebraska (AP-1; UP-1)

Centers
 Kurt Burris, Oklahoma (AP-1; UP-1)

Key

See also
1954 College Football All-America Team

References

All-Big Seven Conference football team
All-Big Eight Conference football teams